All in Good Time is an album by Rob McConnell and the Boss Brass that won the Grammy Award for Best Large Jazz Ensemble Album in 1984.

Track listing

Personnel
 Rob McConnell – valve trombone
 Jerry Toth – alto saxophone, clarinet
 Moe Koffman – alto saxophone, soprano saxophone, flute, piccolo 
 Bob Leonard – baritone saxophone, bass clarinet
 Eugene Amaro –  tenor saxophone, flute 
 Rick Wilkins – tenor saxophone, flute, clarinet 
 Ian McDougall, Bob Livingston, Dave McMurdo –  trombone
 Ron Hughes –  bass trombone
 Guido Basso, Erich Traugott, Arnie Chycoski, Dave Woods, John MacLeod –  trumpet, flugelhorn
 George Stimpson, James MacDonald – French horn 
 Jimmy Dale –  piano, electric piano
 Steve Wallace – double bass, bass guitar 
 Ed Bickert – guitar 
 Terry Clarke – drums
 Brian Leonard – percussion

Production
 Rob McConnell – producer, liner notes 
 Paul Jennings– producer
 Phil Sheridan – producer, engineer
 Joe Finlan – assistant engineer
 Peter Norman – mastering

References

Grammy Award for Best Large Jazz Ensemble Album
Big band albums
Palo Alto Records albums
Juno Award for Best Jazz Album albums
1982 albums
Rob McConnell & The Boss Brass albums